was a Japanese boxer. He competed in the men's welterweight event at the 1964 Summer Olympics.

References

1942 births
2013 deaths
Japanese male boxers
Olympic boxers of Japan
Boxers at the 1964 Summer Olympics
Place of birth missing
Asian Games medalists in boxing
Boxers at the 1962 Asian Games
Asian Games silver medalists for Japan
Medalists at the 1962 Asian Games
Welterweight boxers
Sportspeople from Ehime Prefecture